Ranasinghe Pathiranage Rashmika Mevan Dulanjana (born 17 October 2001) is a Sri Lankan cricketer. He made his List A debut on 3 April 2021, for Ace Capital Cricket Club in the 2020–21 Major Clubs Limited Over Tournament.

References

External links
 

2001 births
Living people
Sri Lankan cricketers
Sri Lanka Ports Authority Cricket Club cricketers
Place of birth missing (living people)